The Hells Canyon Massacre (also known as the Snake River Massacre) was a massacre where thirty-four Chinese goldminers were ambushed and murdered in May 1887. In 2005, the area was renamed Chinese Massacre Cove, and a memorial was placed there in 2012 in three languages, Chinese, English, and Nez Perce.

Massacre
Two groups of Chinese miners, led by Chea Po and Lee She, departed Lewiston in October 1886 and headed upriver along the Snake into Oregon's Hells Canyon to search for gold. Chea's group stopped on the Oregon side of the Snake, near Robinson Gulch and the cove where Deep Creek empties into the Snake. Lee's group continued upriver to Salt Creek. Chea Po had chosen a location just upstream of Dug Bar, a ford used by horse and cattle thieves to cross the Snake. Dug Bar was named for Thomas J. Douglas, a thief who had used the area to graze his horses. The gang consisted of Evans, J.T. ("Tigh") Canfield, C.O. (Homer) LaRue, Frank Vaughn, Carl (or Hezekiah) Hughes, Hiram Maynard and Robert McMillan, a fifteen-year-old boy.

In late May 1887 (May 25, according to Stratton) the gang of seven white horse gang members robbed, murdered, and mutilated between 10 and 34 Chinese employees of the Sam Yup Company, reportedly for their gold. Estimates of the value of gold stolen range from $4,000 to $50,000. According to a contemporaneous news article, the gold dust was given to Canfield for safekeeping, but he double-crossed the rest of the gang and fled the county.

Robert McMillan made a deathbed confession to his father Hugh recounting details of the massacre, which were published in 1891. According to Hugh McMillan, the Chinese miners were ambushed by a party consisting of Robert McMillan, Bruce Evans, J.T. Canfield, Max Larue, and Frank Vaughn in late April 1887. Hiram Maynard and Carl Hughes were traveling with the others, but did not participate in the ambush. Canfield and Larue first attacked the camp of thirteen Chinese from the bluffs overlooking the cove, driving them towards Evans and Vaughn, who were in the path of their retreat. Twelve Chinese were killed in the initial fusillade; then the remaining man had "his brains beaten out", retrieving $5,500 in gold dust. The next day, eight more Chinese returned to the camp by boat, where the gang shot and killed them, throwing the 21 bodies into the Snake River. The gang then stole the boat and traveled  to the next Chinese camp, where they killed 13 more and retrieved $50,000 in gold. Hugh McMillan stated that Robert was only present for the first day's events, but the gang had discussed the next day's plans before Robert left the others.

According to a modern account, Vaughn stayed behind to prepare dinner while the other six rode to ambush the miners. McMillan minded the horses; Canfield and LaRue shot from the rim of Robinson Gulch, while Evans shot from the river level; Hughes and Maynard were positioned upstream and downstream to catch any miner who tried to flee along the river. Their surprise attack was successful, and all ten of the miners at the camp were killed, the last with a rock after the gang had run out of ammunition. The remainder of the modern account agrees with McMillan's deathbed confession: the gang returned to the Douglas cabin and restocked their ammunition; then on next day, Evans, Canfield, and LaRue ambushed a group of eight Chinese miners who returned to the cove, and finally sailed to a second camp, where they killed thirteen more miners.

Horner and Findley accounts 
Recently, attempts to formulate an accurate picture of the event were drawn from hidden copies of trial documents that contained grand jury indictment, depositions given by the accused, notes from the trial, and historical accounts of Wallowa County by J. Harland Horner and H. Ross Findley.

Horner and Findley were both schoolboys at the time of the massacre but their accounts had glaring discrepancies. Findley believed the massacre was a planned event with more than just a motive to steal gold from the Chinese miners. He believed the arrested culprits wanted to eliminate the Chinese miners from the area as well, which they successfully accomplished. In contrast to most accounts, Findley only recalled 31 confirmed victims, and there was no mention of a trial. On the other hand, Horner believed that the event was a spur of the moment event and affected 34 confirmed victims. The schoolboys initially only planned to steal horses, but they experienced difficulty crossing the river with the stolen horses. When the Chinese miners refused to loan their boats, the boys decided to take the boats by force.

The bodies
The bodies of some murder victims began washing ashore soon afterward, swept downstream to places as far away as Lime Point (south of the mouth of the Grande Ronde River), Log Cabin Island (now the site of the Lower Granite Dam), and Penawawa, Washington. Each body bore unmistakable markings of great violence; J.K. Vincent, a federal official who investigated the crime, later wrote "every one was shot, cut up and stripped and thrown in the River." Lee She's group went to visit Chea Po's group at Robinson Gulch in early June 1887, and found three bodies in the deserted, ransacked camp; they fled in terror to Lewiston, where they reported the crimes.

A news article published in July 1887 called the corpses a "severe warning to Chinese miners" and blamed the victims: "More than likely it was the whites who look with an evil eye upon Chinese intrusion in American mines. The American miner kicks hard at the Chinese miner." Other local Chinese Americans believed that all Chinese miners along the Snake had been killed once the mutilated bodies began to surface. Initially, "a thorough investigation" described in a July 17, 1887 article concluded the Chinese had been murdered by rival Chinese miners, since the victims had been "shot in the back and mutilated by cleavers, a weapon in general use by the Chinese." George S. Craig owned the Douglas cabin and discovered numerous skeletons in the area when he returned to winter his stock in the fall of 1887.

Disagreements can be attributed to the fact that the bodies of the Chinese miners were only found downstream after two weeks. It is unclear whether the bodies were mangled in the course of human manslaughter or as the aftermath of being thrown into turbulent waters. The rapids and brute force of the current could have mangled the bodies against the rocks. However, it was confirmed that the Chinese men were shot because gunshot wounds were found on their bodies. Only ten bodies were identified on February 16, 1888: Chea-po, Chea-Sun, Chea-Yow, Chea-Shun, Chea Cheong, Chea Ling, Chea Chow, Chea Lin Chung, Kong Mun Kow, and Kong Ngan. Little is known about these identified men.

Aftermath 
Frank Vaughn confessed to the crime in 1888 and his testimony led to the indictment of the other six gang members on March 23, 1888. In follow-up testimony given on April 16, Vaughn blamed Evans, Canfield, and LaRue for the massacre, and said that he, Hughes, Maynard, and McMillan had not participated. Vaughn himself was arrested on April 18. By the time he was arrested, almost the entire gang had left America, save Vaughn and Hughes.

Three of the gang (Maynard, McMillan, and Hughes) were brought to trial but none were convicted. The trio were arraigned on August 28, 1888, and pleaded not guilty on August 29. Their testimony was consistent with Vaughn's, namely, that blame for the crime fell squarely on Evans, Canfield, and LaRue, all absent. The jury found the three men not guilty on September 1, 1888, following a short trial.

 J.T. Canfield was imprisoned in Kansas for stealing mules and returned to Wallowa County to search for gold after his release. He was noted to be in the area during the trial, and moved to Texas before settling in Idaho and opening a blacksmith shop as Charley Canfield.
 Bruce Evans was arrested within a week of the massacre on an unrelated rustling charge. He escaped from custody two weeks later, possibly with the help of Hughes and Vaughn. When he fled, he left two children and his wife behind. His name is engraved on a memorial arch in the courthouse square of Enterprise, Oregon, honoring the early pioneers of the county.
 C.O. LaRue was rumored to have died in a dispute over a card game in California.
 Robert McMillan died of diphtheria in 1888 at the age of 16.

Legacy
In 1995, Charlotte McIver discovered a cache of documents relating to the 1888 trial in an old safe being donated to the Wallowa County Museum. When the news came to the attention of R. Gregory Nokes, a reporter for The Oregonian, he began his own research into the massacre, going on to publish a journal article in 2006 and a nonfiction book, Massacred for Gold. The Chinese in Hells Canyon in 2009 after his retirement in 2003 allowed him to conduct research full-time.

The United States Board on Geographic Names officially named the five-acre Deep Creek massacre site to the Chinese Massacre Cove in 2005 over the objections of Wallowa County commissioners.  This was the first ever official recognition of the crime.

Deep Creek, a fictionalized account of the massacre and its aftermath written by William Howarth and Anne Matthews under the pen name "Dana Hand" was published in 2010. It was selected by The Washington Post as one of the best novels of 2010.

It was engraved with words in three languages: English, Nez Perce, and Chinese. It was dedicated on June 22, 2012.

Two episodes of the television show Ghost Mine, first aired in October 2013, covered the investigation of paranormal activity at Chinese Massacre Cove.

Peter Ludwin wrote and published a collection of poetry in 2016, Gone to Gold Mountain. He states he was inspired after reading Massacred for Gold, the 2009 book by R. Gregory Nokes.

In 2016, the Oregon Historical Society and Oregon Public Broadcasting produced a 27-minute documentary Massacre At Hells Canyon.

The television show Leverage aired an episode on Jan.1, 2012 called The Gold Job using the story of the Snake River Massacre as the back story for their con.

See also

 Chinese American history
 Anti-Chinese sentiment in the United States
 Chinese Exclusion Act
 Anti-Chinese violence in Oregon
 Anti-Chinese violence in California
 Anti-Chinese violence in Washington
 Chinese massacre of 1871
 San Francisco riot of 1877
 Rock Springs massacre, 1885
 Attack on Squak Valley Chinese laborers, 1885
 Tacoma riot of 1885
 Seattle riot of 1886
 Pacific Coast Race Riots of 1907
 Bellingham riots of 1907
 Torreón massacre, 1911 in Mexico

References

Bibliography

External links

 PBS account
Article at the Oregon Encyclopedia
Sept. 1, 1887: A Massacre Of Chinese Miners Produced by Oregon Public Broadcasting
Massacre at Hells Canyon Documentary produced by Oregon Public Broadcasting
 
 
 
 
 
 

Conflicts in 1887
1887 in Oregon
1887 murders in the United States
Massacres in 1887
Chinese-American culture in Oregon
Anti-Chinese violence in the United States
Asian-American issues
Murder in Oregon
Wallowa–Whitman National Forest
May 1887 events
Massacres in the United States
History of racism in Oregon
Hate crimes